The 2004 IAAF World Outdoor Meetings was the second edition of the annual global series of one-day track and field competitions organized by the International Association of Athletics Federations (IAAF). The series had four levels: 2004 IAAF Golden League, IAAF Super Grand Prix, IAAF Grand Prix and IAAF Grand Prix II. There were 6 Golden League meetings, 8 Super Grand Prix category meetings, 9 IAAF Grand Prix category meetings and 11 Grand Prix II meetings, making a combined total of 34 meetings for the series.

The series hosted the same number of meetings as the previous year. The Qatar Athletic Super Grand Prix was added to Super Grand Prix, the Helsinki Grand Prix was dropped from the Grand Prix circuit and the Cena Slovenska - Slovak Gold Grand Prix II meeting was replaced by the Grande Premio Rio de Atletismo. Three meetings changed venue from 2003: the Bislett Games moved from Oslo to Bergen due to stadium developments, the Athens Grand Prix Tsiklitiria was moved from Trikala to Heraklion, and the Brother Znamensky Memorial moved from Tula, Russia to Kazan.

Performances on designated events on the circuit earned athletes points which qualified them for entry to the 2004 IAAF World Athletics Final, held on 18–19 September in Monaco.

Meetings

References

2004
IAAF Grand Prix